The men's decathlon event at the 2014 African Championships in Athletics was held on August 10–11 on Stade de Marrakech.

Medalists

Results

100 metres
Wind:Heat 1: +1.0 m/s, Heat 2: +1.0 m/s

Long jump

Shot put

High jump

400 metres

110 metres hurdles
Wind: +0.2 m/s

Discus throw

Pole vault

Javelin throw

1500 metres

Final standings

References

2014 African Championships in Athletics
Combined events at the African Championships in Athletics